David Chart is a game designer who has worked primarily on role-playing games.

Career
David Chart authored Akrasia: Thief of Time (2001), the first in Eden Studios's "Eden Odyssey" series of adventures. Chart took over as Ars Magica Line Editor for Atlas Games in 2002. Chart oversaw the Ars Magica fifth edition rules in late 2004. Chart has actively worked to expand the pool of writers for Ars Magica with "open calls" which anyone can submit drafts for.

Awards
In 2005, Ars Magica fifth edition (for which Chart was the developer) won the Origins Award for best role-playing game and the Gold ENnie Award for best rules.

References

External links
 Home page
 

Atlas Games people
Living people
Role-playing game designers
Year of birth missing (living people)